Hyusein Filipov (born 28 May 1992) is a Bulgarian football player, currently playing as a midfielder for Zagorets Nova Zagora.

Honours
Champion of B PFG 2013 (with Neftochimic Burgas)
Champion of Amateur Football League 2014 (with Vereya Stara Zagora)

External links 
  Profile

Living people
1992 births
Bulgarian footballers
Association football midfielders
OFC Sliven 2000 players
Neftochimic Burgas players
FC Vereya players
First Professional Football League (Bulgaria) players
Sportspeople from Sliven